Lynnville is a village in Morgan County, Illinois, United States. The population was 137 at the 2000 census. It is part of the Jacksonville Micropolitan Statistical Area.

Geography

Demographics

As of the census of 2000, there were 137 people, 55 households, and 38 families residing in the village. The racial makeup of the village was 99.27% White and 0.73% Native American. Hispanic or Latino of any race were 0.73% of the population.

There were 55 households, out of which 29.1% had children under the age of 18 living with them, 54.5% were married couples living together, 7.3% had a female householder with no husband present, and 30.9% were non-families. 25.5% of all households were made up of individuals, and 14.5% had someone living alone who was 65 years of age or older. The average household size was 2.49 and the average family size was 3.03.

In the village, the population was spread out, with 21.9% under the age of 18, 13.9% from 18 to 24, 26.3% from 25 to 44, 24.1% from 45 to 64, and 13.9% who were 65 years of age or older. The median age was 34 years. For every 100 females, there were 107.6 males. For every 100 females age 18 and over, there were 114.0 males.

The median income for a household in the village was $38,000, and the median income for a family was $40,313. Males had a median income of $19,375 versus $21,500 for females. The per capita income for the village was $14,919. There were none of the families and 1.4% of the population living below the poverty line, including no under eighteens and none of those over 64.

References

Villages in Morgan County, Illinois
Villages in Illinois
Jacksonville, Illinois micropolitan area